The 2014 season was São Paulo's 85th year since the club's existence. The team played the Campeonato Paulista between January and March being defeated in the quarterfinal single match against Penapolense, after a 0-0 draw in the home stadium Morumbi, São Paulo's fall in the penalty shootout by 4-5. In the Copa do Brasil the club reach the third round when it was beaten by Bragantino with an aggregated score of 3-4 (2-1 away; 1-3 home). The second half of the year was most promising to the Muricy Ramalho's team, in Copa Sudamericana Tricolor was only defeated in the semifinals in face of Colombian club Atlético Nacional over again on penalty shootout this time by 1-4. In the national league Série A, the Dearest take a place in the Copa Libertadores ending the table on second place with 70 points, 10 behind the absolute champion Cruzeiro. The highlight of the year was the return of Kaká, the FIFA World Player of the Year in 2007. Kaká was loaned by American club Orlando City until the end of the season and played 24 matches scoring 3 goals. In the last match of midfielder at November 30, in a 1-1 draw against Figueirense in a game by 37th round of the league, Kaká was acclaimed for more than 30,000 São Paulo fans. Other highlight was noted by the 41 years old capitain Rogerio Ceni that announced the retirement at the end of season. The goalkeeper surpass the mark of 590 victories in official matches reached by Ryan Giggs, the feat was done in October 27 after a 3-0 victory over Goiás. Rogério also arrived the number of 123 goals, almost twice the mark of the second goalkeeper goalscorer Chilavert with 62 goals. Only two matches before the end of season Rogério postponed his retirement to 2015 season.

Jogadores

Removed from first squad

Out on loan

Transfers

In

Out

Statistics

Appearances and goals

|-
|colspan="14" style="text-align:center;" |Players who are on loan/left São Paulo this season:

|-
|}

Top scorers

Clean sheets
Includes all competitive matches. The list is sorted by shirt number when total clean sheets are equal.

Last updated on 27 November

Disciplinary record
{| class="wikitable" style="font-size: 95%; text-align: center;"
|-
| rowspan="2"  style="width:5%; text-align:center;"|
| rowspan="2"  style="width:5%; text-align:center;"|
| rowspan="2"  style="width:5%; text-align:center;"|
| rowspan="2"  style="width:15%; text-align:center;"|Player
| colspan="3" style="text-align:center;"|Campeonato Paulista
| colspan="3" style="text-align:center;"|Copa do Brasil
| colspan="3" style="text-align:center;"|Campeonato Brasileiro
| colspan="3" style="text-align:center;"|Copa Sudamericana
| colspan="3" style="text-align:center;"|Total
|-
!  style="width:60px; background:#fe9;"| 
!  style="width:60px; background:#ff8888;"|
!  style="width:60px; background:#ff8888;"|
!  style="width:60px; background:#fe9;"|
!  style="width:60px; background:#ff8888;"|
!  style="width:60px; background:#ff8888;"|
!  style="width:60px; background:#fe9;"|
!  style="width:60px; background:#ff8888;"|
!  style="width:60px; background:#ff8888;"|
!  style="width:60px; background:#fe9;"|
!  style="width:60px; background:#ff8888;"|
!  style="width:60px; background:#ff8888;"|
!  style="width:60px; background:#fe9;"|
!  style="width:60px; background:#ff8888;"|
!  style="width:60px; background:#ff8888;"|
|-
|GK
|
|01
|Rogério Ceni
|0
|0
|0
|1
|0
|0
|1
|0
|0
|1
|0
|0
|3
|0
|0
|-
|DF
|
|2
|Rafael Toloi
|0
|0
|0
|0
|0
|0
|3
|0
|0
|1
|0
|0
|4
|0
|0
|-
|DF
|
|3
|Rodrigo Caio
|4
|0
|0
|1
|1
|0
|2
|0
|0
|0
|0
|0
|7
|1
|0
|-
|DF
|
|4
|Antônio Carlos
|3
|0
|0
|0
|0
|0
|5
|0
|0
|0
|0
|0
|8
|0
|0
|-
|MF
|
|5
|Souza
|1
|0
|0
|1
|0
|0
|6
|0
|0
|1
|0
|0
|9
|0
|0
|-
|DF
|
|6
|Álvaro Pereira
|4
|0
|0
|3
|0
|0
|12
|0
|1
|1
|0
|0
|20
|0
|1
|-
|MF
|
|7
|Michel Bastos
|0
|0
|0
|0
|0
|0
|3
|0
|2
|1
|0
|0
|4
|0
|2
|-
|MF
|
|8
|Kaká
|0
|0
|0
|0
|0
|0
|7
|0
|0
|1
|0
|0
|8
|0
|0
|-
|FW
|
|9
|Luís Fabiano
|4
|0
|0
|0
|0
|0
|4
|0
|0
|1
|0
|1
|9
|0
|1
|-
|MF
|
|10
|Paulo Henrique Ganso
|2
|1
|0
|2
|0
|0
|9
|0
|0
|1
|0
|0
|14
|1
|0
|-
|FW
|
|11
|Alexandre Pato
|0
|0
|0
|0
|0
|0
|4
|0
|0
|0
|0
|0
|4
|0
|0
|-
|GK
|
|12
|Denis
|0
|0
|0
|0
|0
|0
|0
|0
|0
|0
|0
|0
|0
|0
|0
|-
|DF
|
|13
|Paulo Miranda
|2
|0
|0
|0
|0
|0
|3
|0
|1
|1
|0
|0
|6
|0
|1
|-
|FW
|
|14
|Alan Kardec
|0
|0
|0
|0
|0
|0
|2
|0
|0
|1
|0
|0
|3
|0
|0
|-
|MF
|
|15
|Denílson
|1
|0
|0
|0
|0
|0
|4
|0
|0
|0
|1
|0
|5
|1
|0
|-
|DF
|
|16
|Reinaldo
|1
|0
|0
|0
|0
|0
|3
|0
|0
|0
|0
|0
|4
|0
|0
|-
|FW
|
|17
|Osvaldo
|2
|0
|0
|0
|0
|0
|5
|0
|0
|0
|0
|0
|7
|0
|0
|-
|MF
|
|18
|Maicon
|2
|0
|0
|1
|0
|0
|5
|0
|0
|1
|0
|0
|9
|0
|0
|-
|FW
|
|19
|Ademilson
|0
|0
|0
|0
|0
|0
|1
|0
|0
|0
|0
|0
|1
|0
|0
|-
|DF
|
|21
|Edson Silva
|0
|0
|0
|0
|0
|0
|4
|0
|0
|0
|0
|0
|4
|0
|0
|-
|GK
|
|24
|Léo
|0
|0
|0
|0
|0
|0
|0
|0
|0
|0
|0
|0
|0
|0
|0
|-
|MF
|
|25
|Hudson
|0
|0
|0
|0
|0
|0
|3
|0
|0
|2
|0
|0
|5
|0
|0
|-
|DF
|
|26
|Auro Jr.
|0
|0
|0
|0
|0
|0
|1
|0
|0
|0
|0
|0
|1
|0
|0
|-
|DF
|
|27
|Luis Ricardo
|0
|0
|0
|0
|0
|0
|1
|0
|0
|0
|0
|0
|1
|0
|0
|-
|FW
|
|29
|Ewandro
|0
|0
|0
|0
|0
|0
|0
|0
|0
|0
|0
|0
|0
|0
|0
|-
|GK
|
|30
|Renan Ribeiro
|0
|0
|0
|0
|0
|0
|0
|0
|0
|0
|0
|0
|0
|0
|0
|-
|DF
|
|34
|Lucão
|0
|0
|0
|0
|0
|0
|1
|0
|0
|1
|0
|0
|2
|0
|0
|-
|MF
|
|35
|Boschilia
|0
|0
|0
|0
|0
|0
|0
|0
|0
|0
|0
|0
|0
|0
|0
|-
|colspan="19"|Players who are on loan/left São Paulo this season:
|-
|DF
|
|3
|Roger Carvalho
|0
|0
|0
|0
|0
|0
|0
|0
|0
|0
|0
|0
|0
|0
|0
|-
|MF
|
|5
|Wellington
|5
|0
|0
|0
|0
|0
|0
|0
|0
|0
|0
|0
|5
|0
|0
|-
|MF
|
|10
|Jádson
|0
|0
|0
|0
|0
|0
|0
|0
|0
|0
|0
|0
|0
|0
|0
|-
|MF
|
|20
|Lucas Evangelista
|1
|0
|0
|0
|0
|0
|0
|0
|0
|0
|0
|0
|1
|0
|0
|-
|MF
|
|21
|Marcelo Cañete
|0
|0
|0
|0
|0
|0
|0
|0
|0
|0
|0
|0
|0
|0
|0
|-
|FW
|
|22
|Dorlan Pabón
|0
|0
|0
|0
|0
|0
|0
|0
|0
|0
|0
|0
|0
|0
|0
|-
|DF
|
|23
|Douglas
|0
|0
|0
|0
|0
|0
|3
|0
|0
|0
|0
|0
|3
|0
|0
|-
|MF
|
|25
|Fabrício
|0
|0
|0
|0
|0
|0
|0
|0
|0
|0
|0
|0
|0
|0
|0
|-
|DF
|
|26
|Clemente Rodríguez
|0
|0
|0
|0
|0
|0
|0
|0
|0
|0
|0
|0
|0
|0
|0
|-
|MF
|
|28
|João Schmidt
|0
|0
|0
|0
|0
|0
|0
|0
|0
|0
|0
|0
|0
|0
|0
|-
|DF
|
|37
|Lucas Farias
|0
|0
|0
|0
|0
|0
|0
|0
|0
|0
|0
|0
|0
|0
|0
|-
| colspan=4 | TOTAL
|32
|1
|0
|9
|1
|0
|92
|0
|4
|14
|1
|1
|147
|3
|5
|-

Managers performance

Overview
{|class="wikitable"
|-
|Games played || 68 (16 Campeonato Paulista, 6 Copa do Brasil, 38 Campeonato Brasileiro, 8 Copa Sudamericana)
|-
|Games won || 37 (8 Campeonato Paulista, 4 Copa do Brasil, 20 Campeonato Brasileiro, 5 Copa Sudamericana)
|-
|Games drawn || 14 (4 Campeonato Paulista, 0 Copa do Brasil, 10 Campeonato Brasileiro, 0 Copa Sudamericana)
|-
|Games lost || 17 (4 Campeonato Paulista, 2 Copa do Brasil, 8 Campeonato Brasileiro, 3 Copa Sudamericana)
|-
|Goals scored || 112
|-
|Goals conceded || 71
|-
|Goal difference || +41
|-
|Clean sheets || 26
|-
|Yellow cards || 147 (32 Campeonato Paulista, 9 Copa do Brasil, 92 Campeonato Brasileiro, 14 Copa Sudamericana)
|-
|Second yellow cards || 3 (1 Campeonato Paulista, 1 Copa do Brasil, 0 Campeonato Brasileiro, 1 Copa Sudamericana)
|-
|Red cards || 5 (0 Campeonato Paulista, 0 Copa do Brasil, 4 Campeonato Brasileiro, 1 Copa Sudamericana)
|-
|Worst discipline || Álvaro Pereira (20 , 0 , 1 )
|-
|Best result || 4–0 (H) v Mogi Mirim - Campeonato Paulista - 2014.01.22  4–0 (H) v Audax - Campeonato Paulista - 2014.03.05
|-
|Worst result || 2–5 (A) v Fluminense - Campeonato Brasileiro - 2014.05.21
|-
|Most appearances || Rogério Ceni (63)
|-
|Top scorer || Luís Fabiano (20)
|-

Friendlies

Competitions

Overall

Campeonato Paulista

Results summary

First stage

Knockout stage

Copa do Brasil

Results Summary

First round

Second round

Third round

Campeonato Brasileiro

Results summary

Results by round

Matches

Copa Sudamericana

Results Summary

Second stage

Round of 16

Quarterfinals

Semifinals

References

External links
official website 

São Paulo FC seasons
Sao Paulo F.C.